Garrulax is a genus of passerine birds in the laughingthrush family Leiothrichidae.

Taxonomy
The genus Garrulax was erected by the French naturalist René Lesson in 1831. The type species was designated in 1961 as the rufous-fronted laughingthrush (Garrulax rufifrons). 

The genus previously included more species. Following the publication of a comprehensive molecular phylogenetic study in 2018, Garrulax  was split up and species were moved to the resurrected genera Ianthocincla and Pterorhinus.

Garrulax species are heavily traded as songbirds.  A survey of eight bird markets in Indonesia, carried out in 2014–2015, found 615 laughingthrushes of nine species openly for sale. Much of the trade in these species in Indonesia is illegal and is pushing a number of these species towards extinction. The Sumatran Laughingthrush, for example, is in serious decline due to ongoing and uncontrolled illegal trade in bird markets on the islands of Java and Sumatra, and is increasingly found in international trade, though in lower numbers.

Species
The genus contains the following 14 species:

References

 Collar, N. J. & Robson C. 2007. Family Timaliidae (Babblers)  pp. 70 – 291 in; del Hoyo, J., Elliott, A. & Christie, D.A. eds. Handbook of the Birds of the World, Vol. 12. Picathartes to Tits and Chickadees. Lynx Edicions, Barcelona.

 
Bird genera
Leiothrichidae
Taxa named by René Lesson